Live in Asheville '19 is a live album by Australian psychedelic rock band King Gizzard & the Lizard Wizard, which was released digitally to Bandcamp on 1 October 2020. They also released the Demos Vol. 1 + Vol. 2 album on the same day.

Information
The album features a set by the band performed at the New Belgium Brewing Company in Asheville, North Carolina, US.

Track listing

Charts

References

2020 live albums
King Gizzard & the Lizard Wizard live albums